is a 2017 Japanese animated super robot film directed by Junji Shimizu. It serves as a sequel to the Mazinger Z and Great Mazinger anime series. The film takes place 10 years after the events of the original series. The film was produced to commemorate the 45th anniversary of the original Mazinger Z. It premiered worldwide in on October 28, 2017 at the 12th Rome Film Festival, and in Japan on January 13, 2018.

Mazinger Z: Infinity also marks Ichiro Mizuki's final theme song contribution prior to his passing on December 12, 2022.

Plot
Ten years after the end of the war against Dr. Hell and his Mechanical Beasts (the events of Great Mazinger are not mentioned, however Tetsuya Tsurugi and Great Mazinger have a significant role in the film) world lives in an era of peace thanks to the development of photonic energy for peaceful purposes. Mazinger Z's pilot Koji Kabuto has become a distinguished scientist, after his father and grandfather, while Sayaka Yumi is now the director of the Photon Research Institute, after her father, Dr. Yumi, became the Prime Minister of Japan. Great Mazinger's pilot Tetsuya Tsurugi is still in the military and married to Jun Hono, who's expecting their first child. Koji's younger brother Shiro is also a military mecha pilot.

While constructing the institute's new building, they find an enormous robot buried beneath Mt. Fuji, which they codename Infinity. When Koji comes to investigate, a girl emerges from the inside. Lisa is the robot's main control unit, a 91% organic AI with feelings. Shortly before, the presumed dead Dr. Hell attacks the institute with new Mechanical Beasts, as well as his henchmen Baron Ashura and Count Brocken, and steals the Infinity, using a captured Tetsuya and Great Mazinger as improvised activation key, since he was unable to get Lisa. Lisa reveals that the final power of the Infinity is the Goragon, the ability to exchange their universe with another, by causing a forced quantum overlapping. Dr. Hell plans to use it, as he believes this world is not worth existing.

Dr. Nossori and Dr. Sewashi use a giant photonic energy 3D Printer to repair and upgrade the original Mazinger Z (which was hidden at the old Photon Research Institute). Koji and Lisa, in the refurbished Mazinger Z, infiltrate the invaded Photon Institute, battling the Mechanical Beasts inside. After defeating Baron Ashura and Count Brocken, Mazinger Z confronts Dr. Hell's robot, but is gravely damaged. Shiro rescues Great Mazinger, and they stop the Goragon countdown but Dr. Hell has a backup of Great Mazinger's activation code on his Bardos scepter and takes control of Infinity, activating Goragon.

In the adjacent dimension, Koji sees an alternate universe where Lisa is his and Sayaka's daughter. Lisa uses herself as a key to give Mazinger a power equivalent to Infinity's, by transmuting photonic energy into matter. Everyone on the planet gives their photonic energy to Mazinger Z, and Koji punches Infinity with Dr. Hell out of the planet, where it explodes. Lisa disappears, assuring Koji they'll see each other again. Meanwhile, Jun gives birth to her and Tetsuya's child.

Afterwards, Koji and Sayaka marry and they are seen walking with a child Lisa.

Voice cast

Production and release
The movie was announced during AnimeJapan 2017, with the tentative title of Gekijōban Mazinger Z (Mazinger Z The Movie). The final title,  Gekijōban Mazinger Z / Infinity (Movie Version Mazinger Z / Infinity), was revealed in the official website in August 2018, alongside the film's trailer.

The film was produced by Toei Animation and distributed by its parent company, Toei. It was directed by Junji Shimizu, based on a script by Takahiro Ozawa, with Hiroya Iijima as character designer and Takayuki Yanase as mecha designer. Toshiyuki Watanabe composed the music. He's the son of Michiaki Watanabe, the composer for the original Mazinger Z and Great Mazinger series. Ichiro Mizuki performed a new version of the classical theme song. He was the performer of the song for the original Mazinger Z and Great Mazinger anime series, as well as several films of the franchise.

A 30-second trailer debuted at Annecy International Animation Film Festival in France in June 2017. The film's world premiere was at the 12th Rome Film Festival on October 28, 2017, presented by author Go Nagai, who was also present at the French premiere in Paris on October 30, 2017. It opened theatrically in Italy on October 31 and in France on November 22, 2017. The Japanese premiere was on January 13, 2018, and the film opened at #6 at the Japanese box office. It premiered in Spain on January 19, 2018 It was released on DVD and Blu-Ray disc in Japan on August 18, 2018.

In November 2017, Viz Media announced at Anime NYC that had licensed the movie, and will release it in the US in 2018. The film had a limited English subbed theatrical screening theatrically in the United States from February 11 to February 12, 2018. The film was distributed on Blu-ray and DVD in North America by Warner Home Entertainment on February 19, 2019.

References

External links
 Official Toei page (in Japanese)
 

2017 anime films
2010s Japanese films
Japanese animated films
Toei Animation films
Mecha films
Mazinger
Super robot anime and manga
Viz Media anime
Films scored by Toshiyuki Watanabe